Kim Ji-yeon (born 1988) is a South Korean fencer.

Kim Ji-yeon, or Kim Ji-yŏn may also refer to:
Kim Chee-yun (born 1970), South Korean violinist
Ji Yeon Kim (fighter) (born 1989), South Korea mixed martial artist
Kim Ji-yeon (born March 1995), South Korean singer known by her stage name Kei as a main vocalist of the girl group Lovelyz
Kim Ji-yeon (born August 1995), South Korean singer known by her stage name Bona as a member of the girl group Cosmic Girls